George Francis Detore (November 11, 1906 – February 7, 1991) was an American professional baseball player, manager, scout and coach. He appeared in 33 games in Major League Baseball as an infielder for the Cleveland Indians from 1930 to 1931 and played in the minor leagues for 17 years. After his on-field career ended, he was a longtime member of the Pittsburgh Pirates organization.

He attended Utica Free Academy and Colgate University, playing for the schools' baseball teams. He began his professional career in 1929 with the Decatur Commodores of the Three-I League. In 135 games primarily as a third baseman, Detore had a .342 batting average, 18 triples, and 10 home runs. His batting average was second-best in the Three-I League behind teammate Floyd "Pat" Patterson's .348 average. After the season ended, Cleveland Indians scout Bill Bradley, who had been watching his progress since his time at Colgate, recommended that the Indians purchase his contract; they did so and gave him an invitation to spring training.

His 17 total hits included seven doubles. He drove in nine runs. Defensively, he started 14 games, even split between shortstop and third base. His last three starts as a big leaguer came in a two-day span in 1931, and he doubled in each game. He was a clutch hitter who did his best work with men on base, hitting a phenomenal .393 with a .455 OBP in 33 such plate appearances. He also hit .429 (6-for-14) against future Hall of Famers.

He was a fixture in the top-level Pacific Coast League as an infielder and catcher. He was a manager in the minors for many years, beginning during World War II as the playing skipper of the PCL San Diego Padres, and then eventually joining the Pirates' organization in 1950. Detore served as an area scout based in New York or scouting supervisor for the Bucs from 1955 to 1963 and 1969 to 1986. He served on Danny Murtaugh's MLB coaching staff from May 6, 1959, through the end of the 1959 season, replacing Jimmy Dykes when Dykes left to become manager of the Detroit Tigers.

References

External links

1906 births
1991 deaths
Baseball players from New York (state)
Buffalo Bisons (minor league) players
Cleveland Indians players
Colgate Raiders baseball players
Decatur Commodores players
Indianapolis Indians players
Louisville Colonels (minor league) players
Major League Baseball infielders
Milwaukee Brewers (minor league) players
New Orleans Pelicans (baseball) players
Pittsburgh Pirates coaches
Pittsburgh Pirates scouts
San Diego Padres (minor league) players
Sportspeople from Utica, New York
Toledo Mud Hens managers
Toledo Mud Hens players